Daşkəsən is a settlement and municipality in the Dashkasan Rayon of Azerbaijan. It has a population of 823.  The municipality consists of the settlement of Daşkəsən and the village of Aşağı Daşkəsən.

References

Populated places in Dashkasan District